Pan Chaoran (Chinese: 潘超然; born 21 April 1992) is a Chinese professional footballer who currently plays as a winger for China League One club Qingdao Youth Island.

Club career
In 2009, Pan Chaoran started his professional footballer career with Changchun Yatai in the Chinese Super League.

In July 2011，Pan moved to Chinese Super League side Nanchang Bayi on a one-year loan deal. He eventually made his league debut for Nanchang on 14 July 2011 in a game against Guangzhou Evergrande, coming on as a substitute for Ko Jae-Sung in the 51st minute. He was released by Changchun at the end of 2014 season.

In March 2016, Pan was signed by China League Two club Hainan Seamen. In February 2017, Pan transferred to League One side Shanghai Shenxin.

Career statistics 
.

References

External links
 

1992 births
Living people
Chinese footballers
Footballers from Hubei
Changchun Yatai F.C. players
Shanghai Shenxin F.C. players
Cangzhou Mighty Lions F.C. players
Chinese Super League players
China League One players
China League Two players
Association football midfielders